The 2018–19 Momentum One Day Cup was a domestic one-day cricket championship that took place in South Africa. It was the 38th edition of the championship, with the tournament running from 8 February to 31 March 2019. Dolphins and Warriors were the defending champions, as the final of the previous competition was washed out, and the trophy shared between the two teams.

Cricket South Africa announced that the semi-finals and final of the competition would take place after the limited overs fixtures against Sri Lanka in March 2019, to help prepare the national side for the 2019 Cricket World Cup. Following the conclusion of the group stage fixtures, Titans, Dolphins, Warriors and the Cape Cobras had all progressed to the semi-finals.

Titans beat Cape Cobras in the first semi-final, with Junior Dala taking his career-best figures of 6/19 in the match. In the second semi-final, Dolphins beat Warriors by seven wickets, chasing down the target of 120 runs inside twenty overs. In the final, Titans beat Dolphins by 135 runs, with Aiden Markram scoring 127 runs.

Points table

 Teams qualified for the finals

Fixtures

Round-robin

Finals

References

External links
 Series home at ESPN Cricinfo

South African domestic cricket competitions
Momentum One Day Cup
2018–19 South African cricket season